Vladimir Aleksandrovich Kovylin (born 12 August 1954) is a Russian professional football coach and a former player. Currently, he manages FC Tambov-M, the youth squad of FC Tambov. As a player, he made his debut in the Soviet Second League in 1976 for FC Revtrud Tambov (as Spartak Tambov was then known).

Honours
 Russian Second Division Zone Center best manager: 2004.

References

1954 births
Living people
Soviet footballers
FC Spartak Tambov players
FC Rubin Kazan players
Russian football managers
FC Ryazan managers
Association football defenders